Aishwarya Rajya Lakshmi Devi Shah (7 November 1949 – 1 June 2001) was the Queen of Nepal from 1972 to 2001, also referred as Bada Maharani (बडामहारानी). She was the wife of King Birendra  and the mother of King Dipendra – who would murder her, her husband, Prince Nirajan, and Princess Shruti in 2001. She was the eldest among the three daughters of late General Kendra Shumsher Jang Bahadur Rana and Shree Rajya Lakshmi Devi Shah in Lazimpat Durbar, Lazimpat, Kathmandu.

She was celebrated as a woman of classical beauty, famous for her hairstyles and ways of dressing.

Education

She had her school education in St Helen's Convent of Kurseong, India and St Mary's of Jawalakhel. She passed S.L.C. from Kanti Ishwari Rajya Laxmi High School in 1963. She was enrolled in the Tribhuvan University-affiliated school, Padmakanya College and graduated in arts in 1967.

Family background
She was from the Rana family which had ruled Nepal for 104 years. She was the eldest daughter of General Kendra Shumsher Jang Bahadur Rana (1921–1982) and his wife, Shree Rajya Lakshmi Shah (1926–2005). She had two brothers (Suraj Shumsher Jang Bahadur Rana; Uday Shumsher Jang Bahadur Rana) and two sisters (Queen Komal Rajya Lakshmi Devi Shah; Princess Prekshya Rajya Lakshmi Devi Shah).   After her death, her younger sister became Queen consort of Nepal. Her family had been the effective rulers of Nepal until the 1950s. In 1970, she married Birendra Bir Bikram Shah Dev, then Crown Prince of Nepal (and her second cousin).

Aishwarya's youngest sister Prekshya also married into the Shah dynasty, marrying Gyanendra and Birendra's brother Prince Dhirendra who was killed in the palace massacre. They divorced in the 1980s. Princess Prekshya was killed in a helicopter crash on 12 November 2001.

Queen of Nepal

After King Mahendra died in 1972, Birendra became the King and Aishwarya became the Queen consort.

Queen Aishwarya was energetic, outspoken and a smart woman having beauty with brains. She arranged different social and cultural programmes.

Queen Aishwarya supported her husband in every steps of her life though difficulties came across them. She was a far sighted women who could understand the need of the country and its people.

The country people took her support for her husband as a dominant nature, but with the passage of time, Queen Aishwarya's dominance over her husband reportedly mellowed down and she was seen as a caring companion for her husband, whose popularity increased with time.

Literary works

She was interested in literature under the pen-name Chadani Shah, wrote dozens of poems which have been collected under the title Aphnai Akash Aphnai Paribesh. The anthology is prefaced with criticisms about Chadani Shah's writing by veteran critics of Nepalese Literature. She was also a famous song composer and her songs were frequently aired by Radio Nepal and Nepal Television.

Murder

Queen Aishwarya was shot dead along with her husband, King Birendra; her son, Prince Nirajan; her daughter, Princess Shruti; and seven other royal family members. It is widely believed that the motive for the murder was the strong opposition to the Crown Prince's proposed marriage to Devyani Rana. Queen Aishwarya's face was so badly disfigured by the gunshot wound that, for the widely attended state funeral procession, it was covered by a porcelain mask bearing her likeness.

Honours

National
  Nepal:
 Member with Collar of the Order of Mahendra
 Member Grand Cross of the Order of Honour
 Member Grand Cross of the Order of the Benevolent Ruler
 Member Grand Cross of the Order of Gorkha Dakshina Bahu
 King Birendra Investiture Medal (24 February 1975)
 Commemorative Silver Jubilee Medal of King Birendra (31 January 1997)

Foreign
 : Dame Grand Cross of the Order of the Dannebrog
 : Grand Cross of the Order of the Virtues, Special Class
 : Grand Cross of the Order of the White Rose
 : Grand Cross of the Order of National Merit
 : Grand Cross Special Class of the Order of Merit of the Federal Republic of Germany
 : Dame Grand Cordon of the Order of the Chrysanthemum
  Lao Royal Family: Dame Grand Cross of Royal Order of the Million Elephants and the White Parasol
 : Grand Cross of the Order of Excellence
  Romania: Grand Cross of the Order of 23 August
 :
 Dame Grand Cross of the Order of Charles III
 Dame Grand Cross of the Order of Isabella the Catholic
 : Dame Grand Cordon of the Order of Chula Chom Klao
 : Grand Cross Great Star of the Order of the Yugoslav Star

Royal Titles

References

External links
"Aishwarya: Nepal's forceful queen" 5 June 2001, BBC news

1949 births
2001 deaths
Nepalese queens consort
2001 murders in Asia
Chandani Shah
Chandani Shah
21st-century Nepalese people
20th-century Nepalese women
21st-century Nepalese women
Deaths by firearm in Nepal
Nepalese murder victims
Hindu monarchs
People murdered in Nepal
Assassinated royalty
Female murder victims
Dames Grand Cross of the Order of Isabella the Catholic
Grand Cross of the Ordre national du Mérite
Members of the Order of Gorkha Dakshina Bahu, First Class
Recipients of Nishan-e-Imtiaz
Grand Crosses Special Class of the Order of Merit of the Federal Republic of Germany
Chandani Shah
Chandani Shah
Chandani Shah
Lyric poets
Nepali-language lyricists
20th-century Nepalese women writers
People of the Nepalese Civil War